Tillandsia subg. Aerobia is a subgenus of the genus Tillandsia.

Species
Species accepted by Encyclopedia of Bromeliads as of October 2022:

Tillandsia afonsoana 
Tillandsia arequitae 
Tillandsia argentina 
Tillandsia baguagrandensis 
Tillandsia barfussii 
Tillandsia barrosoae 
Tillandsia bermejoensis 
Tillandsia boliviensis 
Tillandsia bonita 
Tillandsia buchlohii 
Tillandsia camargoensis 
Tillandsia cardenasii 
Tillandsia caulescens 
Tillandsia chiletensis 
Tillandsia cochabambae 
Tillandsia colganii 
Tillandsia colorata 
Tillandsia comarapaensis 
Tillandsia diaguitensis 
Tillandsia didisticha 
Tillandsia dorisdaltoniae 
Tillandsia dorotheae 
Tillandsia erici 
Tillandsia friesii 
Tillandsia genseri 
Tillandsia gerdae 
Tillandsia goyazensis 
Tillandsia hasei 
Tillandsia hegeri 
Tillandsia helmutii 
Tillandsia koehresiana 
Tillandsia lechneri 
Tillandsia lorentziana 
Tillandsia lotteae 
Tillandsia markusii 
Tillandsia mereliana 
Tillandsia muhriae 
Tillandsia oropezana 
Tillandsia pfeufferi 
Tillandsia prolata 
Tillandsia pseudocardenasii 
Tillandsia ramellae 
Tillandsia recurvispica 
Tillandsia rosacea 
Tillandsia rosarioae 
Tillandsia tafiensis 
Tillandsia uruguayensis 
Tillandsia vernicosa 
Tillandsia violaceiflora 
Tillandsia walter-richteri 
Tillandsia xiphioides 
Tillandsia yuncharaensis 
Tillandsia zecheri

References

Plant subgenera
Aerobia